The Fietsflat is a 3-storey free-to-use public bicycle parking facility in Amsterdam. It is located on Stationseiland island next to Amsterdam Central Station and can accommodate 2500 bicycles. The name is derived from fiets (bicycle) and flat, an originally English word which the Dutch use to denote multi-level apartment complexes.

History 
Alderman of Traffic and Transport of the City of Amsterdam Frank Köhler opened the Fietsflat on 5 April 2001. The bike parking facility was designed to be only temporary, needed during construction works around the Central Station area. It was to be closed in 2004, but kept open due to high demand of parking spaces. New proposals to close the structure in 2009 failed as well. In summer of 2017 the structure underwent renovations. The Fietsflat closed in January of 2023, after an underground bicycle parking garage with the capacity of 7,000 bicycles, was opened on the front side of the station. The flat was not demolished, but kept in reserve. It could be opened again, if it takes too long to construct the newest east side garage, with a capacity of 8,800 bicycles plus 450 OV-fietsen.

Design 
The Fietsflat was designed by VMX Architecten. The structure is 100 metres long, 14 metres wide and 3 storeys tall. Because the facility is so long and high, bicycling is permitted throughout. During the design process the designers had to keep a couple of strict preconditions in mind. The structure could not damage or otherwise penetrate the then newly renovated quay on which is resides. Also the canal boats had to be able to still make their turns in the Open Havenfront basin. To meet security needs the structure has been designed as transparently as possible. The floors are inclined, which helps to keep unwanted people out because it is not comfortable to stay in for a longer amount of time. To ensure safety there is security personnel on site 24/7. The design was nominated for the NAi Architectuurprijs award in 2001.

Expansion 
There were plans to build a second, identical, Fietsflat on the IJ side of Amsterdam Central Station due to open September 2006. In April of the same year, the City Council did not approve of the 4 million euro budget. They opted for more flexible, faster and cheaper solutions with temporary parking spots on several locations, including pontoons and ferries.

In 2014 the City approved a large new underground bicycle parking facility underneath the Open Havenfront at Prins Hendrikkade, right opposite the Fietsflat. In 2017 the City approved a large new underground garage in the IJ at the backside of Centraal Station. The underwater bicycle parking station at Prins Hendrikkade, which was opened in January 2023, has 7.000 parking spots, and by 2030 there will be a total 21.500 parking spots around Amsterdam Central Station.

References

Bicycle parking
Buildings and structures in Amsterdam
Cycling in Amsterdam
Cycling infrastructure in the Netherlands
Transport buildings and structures in the Netherlands